Landes is an unincorporated community in Grant County, West Virginia, United States.

Mrs. A. S. Landes, an early postmaster, gave the community her name.

References

Unincorporated communities in Grant County, West Virginia
Unincorporated communities in West Virginia